Puerto Rico Highway 633 (PR-633) is an east–west rural road located between the municipalities of Ciales and Morovis, Puerto Rico. It begins at its intersection with PR-149 in Hato Viejo barrio and ends at its junction with PR-155 in Barahona.

Major intersections

Related route

Puerto Rico Highway 6633 (PR-6633) is a spur route located in Ciales. It extends from PR-6685 to PR-149, near to PR-633.

See also

 List of highways numbered 633

References

External links

 Guía de Carreteras Principales, Expresos y Autopistas 

633